Petrozzi is an Italian surname. Notable people with this surname include:

 Astolfo Petrozzi (1583–1653 or 1665), Italian painter 
 Clara Petrozzi (born 1965), Peruvian-born violinist, violist, musicologist and composer
 Luca Petrozzi (born 1995), English born Italian rugby union player
 Morella Petrozzi, one of the judges of the dance reality El Gran Show

See also
 Petri
 Petrazzi

Italian-language surnames
Surnames from given names